Rebutia minuscula is a species of cactus from South America found in northern Argentina and Bolivia. It is the type species of the genus Rebutia. As its synonym Rebutia senilis it has gained the Royal Horticultural Society’s Award of Garden Merit. Its cultivars 'Krainziana', 'Marsoneri' and 'Violaciflora' are also listed as having gained the Award of Garden Merit.

The status of the species of Rebutia is currently uncertain; indeed the genus as defined by Anderson (2001) has been shown to be polyphyletic. The stem has 16–20 ribs with small but distinct tubercles ("bumps"). As in other species of Rebutia, the flowers are not produced at the top of the stem, but from around the base. Other authorities include synonyms such as R.marsoneri, with yellow to orange flowers, in R. minuscula, giving the species a much broader range of flower colour.

Subtaxa
The following varieties are accepted:
Rebutia minuscula var. minuscula
Rebutia minuscula var. wessneriana (Bewer.) Eb.Scholz

References

minuscula
Cacti of South America
Endemic flora of Argentina